Charlton Ehizuelen (born 30 November 1953) is a Nigerian former track and field athlete who competed in the long jump and triple jump. The latter mark from 1975 remains the Nigerian indoor record.

As an international competitor, he became the first person to win both long jump and triple jump titles at the All-Africa Games, doing so at the 1978 Games in Algiers. He was also a double winner at the one-off West African Games held in 1977. At the inaugural 1977 IAAF World Cup he was a long jump bronze medallist and triple jump fourth-placer. He was one of only three members of the African team to reach the podium that year, alongside Ethiopians Miruts Yifter and Eshetu Tura. He represented Africa again at the 1981 IAAF World Cup, but was eighth in the long jump on that occasion. His international career on the highest stage was stymied by Nigeria's boycotts of the 1976 Montreal Olympics where he was a favorite for a medal and the 1978 Commonwealth Games, done in response to South African apartheid.

Ehizuelen attended University of Illinois and won the NCAA Division I Championship titles in the men's long jump (1975) and the men's triple jump (1974). He was the first African to win either title. He also twice won the long jump at the NCAA Men's Division I Indoor Track and Field Championships (1976, 1977). His success in the American collegiate system came at a time of growing foreign participation in college track, with eight non-Americans winning titles at the 1975 NCAA Championships. He also competed collegiately in his native continent, winning a long jump/triple jump double at the 1975 All-Africa University Games and defending his long jump title four years later. He remained based in the United States during his career and was the long jump winner at the USA Indoor Track and Field Championships.

Ehizuelen remains resident in the United States, is a member of USA Track and Field and has advocated greater support of the Nigerian diaspora to bolster the nation's sporting success.

International competitions

National titles
USA Indoor Track and Field Championships
Long jump: 1978
NCAA Division I Outdoor Track and Field Championships
Long jump: 1975
Triple jump: 1974
NCAA Division I Indoor Track and Field Championships
Long jump: 1976, 1977

Seasonal bests
Long jump
1975: 
1976: 
1977: 
1978: 
1979: 
1980: 
1981:

See also
List of African Games medalists in athletics (men)

References

External links

All-Athletics profile

Living people
1953 births
Nigerian male long jumpers
Nigerian male triple jumpers
African Games gold medalists for Nigeria
African Games medalists in athletics (track and field)
Illinois Fighting Illini men's track and field athletes
Nigerian emigrants to the United States
Athletes (track and field) at the 1978 All-Africa Games
20th-century Nigerian people